Markóc is a village in Baranya county, Hungary.

Etymology
The name is of Slavic origin *Markьcь or Markovc(i), see Markovac, Markovci. 1403 Markochel (Markolch?), 1492 Markowcz.

Demographics
In 2001, the population of Baranya county numbered 407,448 inhabitants, including: 
 Hungarians = 375,611 (92.19%)
 Germans = 22,720 (5.58%)
 Romani = 10,623 (2.61%)
 Croats = 7,294 (1.79%)
 others.

References

Populated places in Baranya County